Jens Isak de Lange Kobro (20 August 1882 – 14 May 1967) was a Norwegian politician for the Liberal Party. He was Minister of Defence 1933–1935.

References

1882 births
1967 deaths
Liberal Party (Norway) politicians
Defence ministers of Norway